Macro-Puinavean is a hypothetical proposal linking some very poorly attested languages to the Nadahup family. The Puinave language is sometimes linked specifically with the Nadahup languages and Nukak-Kakwa group, as Puinave–Maku. Paul Rivet (1920) and other researchers proposed decades ago the hypothesis of a Puinave-Makú family. Later, Joseph Greenberg (1987) grouped the Puinave-Makú languages, together with the Tucano family, the Katukinan, Waorani and Ticuna languages in the Macro-Tukano trunk. 

Punave-Maku and the Máku language (Maku of Auari) is sometimes connected to the Arutani–Sape languages (yet again also known as Maku) in a Kalianan branch, a connection which Kaufman (1990) finds "promising", but there is too little data on these languages to know for sure. Hodï has been proposed specifically as a sister of Puinave–Maku too.

Kaufman (1994: 60, 2007: 67–68) also adds Katukinan to the family.

Language contact
For the Puinave-Nadahup languages, Jolkesky (2016) notes that there are lexical similarities with the Tupian, Harakmbet, Katukina-Katawixi, Arawak, and Karaja language families due to contact, pointing to an origin of Proto-Puinave-Nadahup in the Madeira River basin.

Criticism
Epps (2008) criticizes the Puinave–Nadahup proposal for relying on inaccurate data, having no clear concept of basic vocabulary, and using an unsystematic mix of Nadahup languages in the comparison. The languages were originally linked simply because they are all called Maku "babble" by Arawakans; that is, because they are spoken by hunter-gatherers.

Since then, some linguists have attempted to verify the connection by finding cognates. However, no convincing cognates have yet been found. For example, Rivet and Tastevin claim that the Hup pronoun am "I" corresponds to Puinave am "I", but the Hup pronoun ’am means "you"; the Hup pronoun for "I" is ’ãh. Other "strikingly similar" pairs, such as Puinave ueyu "day" and Hup uerhó "sun", are not particularly convincing, and no regular sound correspondences have been detected.

On other hand, Martins (1999 and 2005) argues that it is possible to relate "eastern Makú" languages with the Nukak-Kakwa group, but he does not find evidence of the relationship with Puinave. Girón (2008) postulates a genetic relationship of the piave with proto-maku, but also the existence of another phone substrate that is not yet known.

See also
Arutani–Sape languages
Naduhup languages

References

 
Indigenous languages of South America
Proposed language families

ru:Пуйнавские языки